Téboulba is a town in the Sahel region of Tunisia. It is located about 25 kilometers south of Monastir. It is part of the administrative governorate of Monastir, and is the county seat of the Delegation with the same name, which has a population of 37,485 people.

References

External links 

Populated places in Monastir Governorate
Communes of Tunisia